Elongation factor G 1, mitochondrial is a protein that in humans is encoded by the GFM1 gene. It is an EF-G homolog.

Eukaryotes contain two protein translational systems, one in the cytoplasm and one in the mitochondria. Mitochondrial translation is crucial for maintaining mitochondrial function and mutations in this system lead to a breakdown in the respiratory chain-oxidative phosphorylation system and to impaired maintenance of mitochondrial DNA. This gene encodes one of the mitochondrial translation elongation factors. Its role in the regulation of normal mitochondrial function and in different disease states attributed to mitochondrial dysfunction is not known.

Model organisms

Model organisms have been used in the study of GFM1 function. A conditional knockout mouse line, called Gfm1tm1a(EUCOMM)Wtsi was generated as part of the International Knockout Mouse Consortium program — a high-throughput mutagenesis project to generate and distribute animal models of disease to interested scientists.

Male and female animals underwent a standardized phenotypic screen to determine the effects of deletion. Twenty four tests were carried out on mutant mice and three significant abnormalities were observed. No homozygous mutant embryos were identified during gestation, and therefore none survived until weaning. The remaining tests were carried out on heterozygous mutant adult mice and decreased circulating amylase levels were observed in male animals.

References

Further reading

Genes mutated in mice